Pikwitonei station is a flag stop station in Pikwitonei, Manitoba, Canada.

Rail Line
The stop is served by Via Rail's Winnipeg – Churchill train.

History
The railway reached the community in 1914, and served as a division point on the railway until 1972.

Footnotes

External links 
Via Rail Station Information

Via Rail stations in Manitoba